Thilakkam is a 2003 Indian Malayalam-language comedy-drama film directed by Jayaraj and written by Rafi Mecartin. Dileep, Kavya Madhavan and Thiagarajan play the lead roles. The rest of the cast include Nedumudi Venu, K. P. A. C. Lalitha, Nishanth Sagar,  Jagathy Sreekumar, Cochin Haneefa, Harisree Ashokan, Salim Kumar and Bindu Panicker. It was remade in Kannada as Nandeesha in 2012, starring Komal.

Plot
Padmanabhan master and his wife is waiting for Unni, their only son who is missing for many years. Ten-year-old Unni gets lost in the crowd during a temple festival where he was along with his neighbour Panikkar, popularly known as Poorappanikkar. Panikkar too did not return since he decided to return only after finding Unni. Ammu is Panikkar's daughter who also believes, like master and his wife, that her father will return one day with Unni. The master publishes a photo made by a artist based on assumptions of older unni in the newspaper and the master finds Unni after years at nagappattinam and returns him to the village.

The villagers realize that Unni is abnormal and is mentally challenged. He behaves like a small boy and creates all sorts of trouble for the villagers and his parents. His main hobby is to snatch dhothi from people. This leads to a series of comical incidents in the village.

He is given Ayurveda treatment under the guidance of the church priest. Ammu looks after Unni, which her cousin Gopikkuttan objects to, as he loves her. Meanwhile, Panicker returns to the village. Gopikuttan tries to turn Panicker against Unni. Eventually, Ammu starts to love Unni and waits for his recovery to marry him. But finally during a fight with gopikuttan, when gopikuttan is about to fall ofa cliff, unni tries to save him by holding onto the mundu by gopi and Unni gets back his memory of his past and realises the truth that he is not Unni but Vishnu, the son of a Bangalore don Maheshwar Thampi, from where the story starts.

Vishnu disapproves Thampi's lifestyle so he lives away from his father. He falls in love with Gauri and decides to marry her against his father's wish. Vishnu and Gauri's friends arrange a secret party for them. Thampi learns about the party and its location. His men attack it and during the commotion, Gauri falls down even though Vishnu tries to save her. In the present, Thampi visits Vishnu and asks him to come home. Vishnu refuses initially but agrees to go along after Padmanabhan Master asks him to do so. At his home, Thampi tells Vishnu that he realised his mistake and for his mistakes Vishnu and Gauri got the punishment. Thampi tells that Gauri is not dead but she is bedridden. Before her death she wanted to meet Vishnu as her last wish which Thampi fulfilled. Gauri asks Vishnu to marry Ammu and to bring her to Gauri. The film ends with Vishnu marrying Ammu, and Krishnankutty, Unni's friend and a village tailor, snatching his dhothi.

Cast

 Dileep as Vishnu, Son of Maheswaran Thampi / Unni (mistaken) 
 Kavya Madhavan as Ammu, Unni's neighbour and love interest 
 Thiagarajan as Maheswaran Thampi, Vishnu/unni's actual father(Voiceover by Sai Kumar)
 Nedumudi Venu as Padmanabhan Master, Unni's father
 K. P. A. C. Lalitha as Devakiyamma, mother of Unni
 Harisree Ashokan as Tailor Krishnankutty,unnis's friend
 Jagathy Sreekumar as Fr. Stephen, the church priest
 Oduvil Unnikrishnan as Poorappanikkar , Ammu's father
 Salim Kumar as Omanakkuttan, As unni's brother in law
 Bindu Panicker as Vanaja as Unni's Sister
 Nishanth Sagar as Gopikkuttan
 Cochin Haneefa as Gunda Bhaskaran
 Mamukkoya as Habeeb, Postman
 Machan Varghese as Kunjavara
 Kalabhavan Shajon
 Kochu Preman as Swaminathan, the oracle
 Bhavana as Gauri (guest role)
 Priyanka as Panjavarnam
 Hakim Rawther
 Subbalakshmi
 Mahalakshmi

Soundtrack

Box office
The film was declared as a commercial success.

Awards
Kerala State Film Award for Best Male Playback Singer - P. Jayachandran for the song Neeyoru puzhayayi

References

External links 

.

2003 films
2000s Malayalam-language films
Films shot in Palakkad
Films shot in Ottapalam
Malayalam films remade in other languages